Pustkowie Rekowskie  is a former village in the administrative district of Gmina Bytów, within Bytów County, Pomeranian Voivodeship, in northern Poland.

References

Pustkowie Rekowskie